The Trans-Karakoram Tract, also known as the Shaksgam Tract, is an area of approximately  north of the Karakoram watershed, including the Shaksgam valley. The tract is administered by China as part of its Taxkorgan and Yecheng counties in the Xinjiang Uyghur Autonomous Region. Although the Shaksgam tract was never under the control of Pakistan since 1947, in the 1963 Sino-Pakistan Agreement, Pakistan recognized Chinese sovereignty over the Shaksgam tract, while China recognized Pakistani sovereignty over the Gilgit Agency, and a border based on actual ground positions was recognized as the international border by China and Pakistan. It is claimed by India as part of the Union territory of Ladakh.

Most of the tract is composed of the Shaksgam Valley and was formerly administered as part of Shigar, a district (formerly a tehsil) in the Baltistan region. A polo ground in Shaksgam was built by the Amacha Royal family of Shigar, and the Rajas of Shigar used to invite the Amirs of Hotan to play polo there. Most of the names of the mountains, lakes, rivers and passes are in Balti/Ladakhi, suggesting that this land had been part of Baltistan/Ladakh region for a long time.

The tract is one of the most inhospitable areas of the world, with some of the highest mountains. Bounded by the Kun Lun Mountains in the north, and the Karakoram peaks to the south, including Broad Peak, K2 and Gasherbrum, on the southeast it is adjacent to the highest battlefield in the world on the Siachen Glacier region which is controlled by India.

History

Historically the people of Hunza cultivated and grazed areas to the north of the Karakoram, and the Mir of Hunza claimed those areas as part of Hunza's territories. Those areas included the Raskam Valley, north of the Shaksgam Valley.

In 1889 the first expedition to the Shaksgam Valley by a European was undertaken by Francis Younghusband (who referred to the Shaksgam as the Oprang).

In March 1899 the British proposed, in a formal Note from Sir Claude MacDonald to China, a new boundary between China and British India. The Note proposed that China should relinquish its claims to suzerainty over Hunza, and in return Hunza should relinquish its claims to most of the Taghdumbash and Raskam districts. The Note proposed a border which broadly followed the main Karakoram crest dividing the watersheds of the Indus River and the Tarim River, but with a variation to pass through a Hunza post at Darwaza near the Shimshal Pass. The Chinese did not respond to the Note and the Indian government never revisited the boundary in the same form again. The MacDonald line was modified in 1905 to include in India a small area east of the Shimshal Pass, to put the border on a stretch of the Shaksgam River.

At the same time, in view of "The Great Game", Britain was concerned at the danger of Russian expansion as Qing dynasty China weakened and so adopted a policy of claiming a border north of the Shaksgam River. This followed a line proposed by Sir John Ardagh in a Memorandum of 1897. That border included the Mir of Hunza's claim over the Raskam Valley. However, British administration never extended north of the Karakoram watershed.

The Gazetteer of Kashmír and Ladákh, first published in 1890 and compiled under the direction of the Quarter Master General in India in the Intelligence Branch, gives a description and details of places inside Kashmir. It includes a description of the Híñdutásh Pass in north eastern Kashmir in the Aksai Chin.  The Gazetteer states in pages 520 and 364 that  “The eastern (Kuenlun) range forms the southern boundary of Khotan”, “and is crossed by two passes,  the Yangi or Elchi Diwan, .... and the Hindutak (i.e. Híñdutásh ) Díwán”. It describes Khotan as “ A province of the Chinese Empire lying to the north of the Eastern Kuenlun range, which here forms the boundary of Ladák".

From 1899 until the independence of India and creation of Pakistan in 1947, the representation of the border on maps varied. In 1926 Kenneth Mason explored and surveyed the Shaksgam Valley.
In 1927 the Government of British India abandoned any claim to the area north of the MacDonald line, but the decision did not find its way on to British maps. By 1959, however, Chinese maps were published showing large areas west and south of the MacDonald line in China. That year, the Government of Pakistan announced its willingness to consult on the boundary question.

Since 1947, India has claimed sovereignty over the entire area of the pre-1947 independent state of Jammu and Kashmir and maintains that Pakistan and China do not share a common border.

In 1954 the Times Atlas predominantly depicted the Cis-Kuen Lun Tract (the region between the Karakoram and Kuen Lun mountains) as a part of Kashmir under the caption "Undefined Frontier area".  The northern border published by the 1954 Times Atlas more or less followed the watershed of the Kuen Lun range from the Taghdumbash Pamir to the Yangi Dawan pass north of Kulanaldi, but east of the Yangi Dawan Pass, the border deviated from the watershed of the Kuen Lun range on the edge of the highlands of Kashmir.

Sino-Pakistan Frontier Agreement

In 1959, the Pakistani government became concerned over Chinese maps that showed areas the Pakistanis considered their own as part of China. In 1961, Ayub Khan sent a formal note to China; there was no reply. It is thought that the Chinese might not have been motivated to negotiate with Pakistan because of Pakistan's relations with India.

In 1962 the Government of Pakistan published an official map depicting the alignment of the northern border of Kashmir, which depicted much of the Cis-Kuen Lun Tract as part of Kashmir. The alignment published by the Government of Pakistan was mostly similar to the portrayal of the northern Border of Kashmir depicted in the 1954 Times Atlas, though in places, the Government of Pakistan's position deviated from the 1954 Times Atlas, and included areas as part of Kashmir which were to the north of the border of Kashmir shown in the Times Atlas. Thus the official position of the Government of Pakistan prior to the 1963 Sino-Pakistan Agreement was that the northern border of Pakistan was on the Kuen Lun range, and the territory ceded by the Government of Pakistan was not just restricted to the Shaksgam Valley but extended to the Kuen Lun range. For an idea of the extent of the Trans-Karakoram Tract or the Cis-Kuen Lun Tract, a view the map (C) from the Joe Schwartzberg's Historical Atlas of South Asia at DSAL in Chicago with the caption, "The boundary of Kashmir with China as portrayed and proposed by Britain prior to 1947" would show that the geographical and territorial extent of the Trans-Karakoram Tract or the Cis-Kuen Lun Tract is more or less the territory enclosed between the northernmost line and the innermost lines.

After Pakistan voted to grant China a seat in the United Nations, the Chinese withdrew the disputed maps in January 1962, agreeing to enter border talks in March. Negotiations between the nations officially began on October 13, 1962, and resulted in the Sino-Pakistan Agreement signed on 2 March 1963 by foreign ministers Chen Yi of China and Zulfikar Ali Bhutto of Pakistan.

The Indian government took the view that the agreement resulted in the surrendering of a significant area to China.

See also
 Glaciers
 Yinsugaiti Glacier
 Sarpo Laggo Glacier

 AGPL (Actual Ground Position Line), south to north runs through the following
 NJ9842, LoC ends and AGPL begins
 Gyong La
 Chumik Glacier
 Saltoro Mountains
 Saltoro Kangri
 Ghent Kangri
 Bilafond La
 Sia La
 Indira Col, AGPL ends at LAC

 Borders
 Actual Ground Position Line (AGPL)
 India–Pakistan International Border (IB)
 Line of Control (LoC)
 Line of Actual Control (LAC)
 Sir Creek (SC)
 Borders of China
 Borders of India
 Borders of Pakistan

 Conflicts
 Kashmir conflict
 Siachen conflict
 Sino-Indian conflict
 List of disputed territories of China
 List of disputed territories of India
 List of disputed territories of Pakistan
 Northern Areas

 Operations
 Operation Meghdoot, by India
 Operation Rajiv, by India
 Operation Safed Sagar, by India

 Other related topics
 Awards and decorations of the Indian Armed Forces
 Bana Singh, after whom Quaid Post was renamed to Bana Top 
 Dafdar, westernmost town in Trans-Karakoram Tract
 India-China Border Roads
 List of extreme points of India
 Sino-Pakistan Agreement for transfer of Trans-Karakoram Tract to China

Notes

References

Bibliography

External links
 Jammu and Kashmir Official Website
 Northern Areas Official Website

Territorial disputes of India
Territorial disputes of China
Kashmir conflict
China–Pakistan relations
Geography of Xinjiang
Kashgar Prefecture
China–India relations
Karakoram
Tashkurgan Tajik Autonomous County
Subregions of Kashmir